Samuel D. Segraves (May 13, 1920 – July 4, 1994) was an American Negro league outfielder in the 1940s.

A native of Bowling Green, Kentucky, Segraves was the younger brother of fellow-Negro leaguer J. C. Segraves. He made his Negro leagues debut in 1942 with the Cleveland Buckeyes and Memphis Red Sox, and played the following season for the Cincinnati Clowns. Segraves died in Indianapolis, Indiana in 1994 at age 74.

References

External links
 and Seamheads

1920 births
1994 deaths
Cincinnati Clowns players
Cleveland Buckeyes players
Memphis Red Sox players
Baseball outfielders